Economists who describe themselves or are described as Post-Keynesian include:

 Athanasios Asimakopulos
 Dean Baker
 Terry Barker
 Paul Davidson
 Evsey Domar
 Alfred Eichner
 James K. Galbraith
 Wynne Godley
 Augusto Graziani
 Geoff Harcourt
 Donald J. Harris
 Michael Hudson
 Nicholas Kaldor
 Michał Kalecki
 Steve Keen
 Stephanie Kelton
 Jan Kregel
 Marc Lavoie
 Frederic S. Lee
 Paolo Leon
 Abba P. Lerner
 Geoffrey Maynard
 Hyman Minsky
 William Francis "Bill" Mitchell
 Basil Moore
 Warren Mosler
 Thomas Palley
 Lars Pålsson Syll
 Luigi Pasinetti
 Joan Robinson
 G. L. S. Shackle
 Robert Skidelsky
 Piero Sraffa
 Anthony Thirlwall
 William Vickrey
 Sidney Weintraub
 Randall Wray

References

 
Post-Keynesian